Chris Karr is an American businessman and politician serving as a member of the South Dakota House of Representatives from the 11th district. Karr assumed office on January 10, 2017.

Early life and education 
Karr is a native of Tabor, South Dakota. He earned a Bachelor of Science degree in business economics from South Dakota State University and a Master of Business Administration from the University of South Dakota.

Career 
Karr has operated a small business in Sioux Falls, South Dakota and also worked as a Certified Valuation Analyst. A member of the Republican Party, Karr serves as one of five Majority Whips in the South Dakota House of Representatives.

References 

Living people
Republican Party members of the South Dakota House of Representatives
Businesspeople from South Dakota
South Dakota State University alumni
University of South Dakota alumni
People from Bon Homme County, South Dakota
Year of birth missing (living people)
21st-century American politicians